Tereza Smitková was the defending champion, but chose not to participate this year.
Caroline Garcia won the title, defeating Louisa Chirico in the final 6–1, 6–3.

Seeds

Draw

Finals

Top half

Bottom half

Qualifying

Seeds

Qualifiers

Lucky losers

Draw

First qualifier

Second qualifier

Third qualifier

Fourth qualifier

External Links
 Main draw
 Qualifying draw

Open de Limoges - Singles
Open de Limoges